KLOZ (92.7 FM, "Mix 92.7") is a radio station licensed to serve Eldon, Missouri, United States. The station is owned by Benne Media and the license is held by Benne Broadcasting Company, LLC.

It broadcasts a hot adult contemporary music format.

The station was assigned the KLOZ call letters by the Federal Communications Commission on December 13, 1987.

History
In November 1982, Eldon Broadcasting Company, Inc., reached an agreement to sell this station to Southwest Communications, Inc. The deal was approved by the FCC on December 30, 1982, and the transaction was consummated on February 7, 1983.

In March 1987, Southwest Communications, Inc., reached an agreement to sell this station to CTC Communications, Inc. The deal was approved by the FCC on May 1, 1987, and the transaction was consummated on June 29, 1987.

In July 1992, CTC Communications, Inc., reached an agreement to sell this station to Capital Media, Inc.  The deal was approved by the FCC on September 4, 1992, and the transaction was consummated on October 20, 1992.

In April 1997, Capital Media, Inc., reached an agreement to sell this station to a Benne Media holding company called Benne Broadcasting Company, LLC. The deal was approved by the FCC on May 20, 1997, and the transaction was consummated on May 29, 1997.

References

External links
KLOZ official website

LOZ
Hot adult contemporary radio stations in the United States
Miller County, Missouri
Radio stations established in 1982
1982 establishments in Missouri